Robert Deutsch is an Israeli antiquities dealer, known for being accused and acquitted of only one forgery charge – out of six, while the other charges were dropped due to being obsolete – of several biblical archaeological artifacts.

Trial, acquittal and subsequent lawsuit    
In 2004, Deutsch, Oded Golan and two others were indicted in a Jerusalem court on charges of forgery. The Israel Antiquities Authority (IAA) claimed that the four were part of a forgery ring that had been operating for more than 20 years, misleading collectors of biblical artifacts into purchasing modern-day forgeries. 
In 2012, Deutsch was acquitted of all charges, with the presiding judge severely criticizing the Israeli police's handling of the evidence.

Following his acquittal, Deutsch sued the IAA, its director Shuka Dorfman, the head of the IAA's anti-theft unit Amir Ganor, the Jerusalem District Attorney and Assistant district Attorney. Demanding $3 million in damages, the suit alleged gross negligence by the defendants.
__

(Jerusalem) 482/04 (Criminal Case)

Date: 17.03.2008 
The State of Israel - Against - 1. Oded Golan, 2. Robert Deutsch, 3. Rafael Braun - deleted, 4. Shlomo Cohen - deleted, 5. Fayez al-Amla - his case is over

In the Jerusalem District Court (17.03.2008)
Honorable Justice Aharon Farkash

...........

The request of the Defendant 2, Robert Deutsch (hereinafter: "the Defendant" or "Deutsch") to cancel the indictment against him, in whole or in part, on the grounds of "defense of justice".

...........

The bottom line is that I did not find grounds for the cancellation of the charges against the defendant, but I found it appropriate to state that there was no room for the harsh and harsh words that were claimed in the application against the investigators on behalf of the Israel Antiquities Authority or against the plaintiff, or against the State barrister Dan Bahat. Each of them fulfills his or her duties, to the best of his ability and in good faith, when he is under the supervision of his superiors. Even if the Defendant's counsel believes that there was no basis for filing an indictment against his client, it would not have been appropriate to use such harsh words and to relate to the Plaintiff and the Investigator some malicious intentions, as stated above, without any basis being laid to prove them.

...........

This being said the defendant's request to cancel the indictment against him, in whole or in part, is rejected.

Source (in Hebrew):
_

Robert Deutsch holds 99% of the stock shares of “Archaeological Center Ltd.” having registered headquarters at 26 Eliezer Kaplan, Herzlia, Israel. Deutsch is also the CEO of the Center.

During the years, both Deutsch and the Center avoided heavy tax payments while illegally claiming that the Center legitimately paid the expenses incurred during Deutsch trial in which he was charged with six criminal offenses.

The tax avoiding payment issue reached the court in several cases and appeals initiated by Deutsch started with the District Court and ended with the Supreme Court. In all these cases Deutsch and the Center actions and claims were turned down by the court while both Deutsch and/or the Center were ordered by the court to pay the significant amounts to the State as "legal expenditures" - these in addition to the taxation debts.

The links related to these matters (Hebrew) are: 
1.
2.

_

Robert Deutsch lost his case 56700-11-13 for USD 3.0 million claiming gross negligence of the State of Israel while the State brought Deutsch to justice accusing him of six law breaking acts. Deutsch made a lot of noise attempting the use of smoke and mirrors when serving the 56700-11-13 lawsuit to the State of Israel which as mentioned was turned down by the Tel Aviv District Court.

_

References 

Biblical archaeology
Year of birth missing (living people)
Living people